Dirk B. Paloutzian (born April 6, 1969) is an American lawyer who is a former nominee to be a United States district judge of the United States District Court for the Eastern District of California.

Early life and education 

Paloutzian was born on April 6, 1969, in Fresno County, California. He earned his Bachelor of Arts from the University of California, Berkeley in 1991 and his Juris Doctor from University of California Davis School of Law in 1994.

Legal career

Paloutzian previously served as a Deputy District Attorney for the Fresno County, California. He was previously in private practice at McCormick Barstow, LLP. Since 2002, he has been a shareholder at Baker Manock & Jensen, P.C., in Fresno, California, where his practice focuses on commercial and agribusiness litigation.

Expired nomination to district court 

On April 29, 2020, President Trump announced his intent to nominate Paloutzian to serve as a United States district judge for the United States District Court for the Eastern District of California. On May 21, 2020, his nomination was sent to the United States Senate. He has been nominated to the seat vacated by Judge Morrison C. England Jr. who assumed senior status on December 17, 2019. On January 3, 2021, his nomination was returned to the President under Rule XXXI, Paragraph 6 of the United States Senate.

References

1969 births
Living people
21st-century American lawyers
California lawyers
People from Fresno County, California
University of California, Berkeley alumni
UC Davis School of Law alumni